Beth Darnall is American scientist, pain psychologist, author, and Associate Professor of Anesthesiology, Perioperative and Pain Medicine at Stanford University where she directs the Stanford Pain Relief Innovations Lab. From 2005 to 2012, Darnall was an assistant professor and associate professor at Oregon Health & Science University.

She is known for developing and investigating brief and scalable behavioral medicine treatments for acute and chronic pain, leading teams of investigators in the conduct of federally-funded randomized controlled clinical trials, research on patient-centered voluntary prescription opioid tapering, advocacy for patient protections during opioid tapering, and vocal opposition of forced opioid tapering practices.

In 2018 she briefed the U.S. Congress on the opioid and pain crises, and in 2019 provided invited testimony to the FDA on iatrogenic harms from forced opioid tapering. Her work has been featured in Scientific American, NPR Radio, BBC Radio, and Nature. In 2018 she spoke on the psychology of pain relief at the World Economic Forum in Davos, Switzerland. Since 2019 she has served as Chief Science Advisor at AppliedVR, a virtual reality therapeutics company that published the first study reporting on at-home skills-based virtual reality for chronic pain treatment. Follow-on studies have included a randomized placebo-controlled trial of an 8-week home-based virtual reality program for chronic pain.

In 2020 Darnall was appointed a scientific member of the National Institutes of Health (NIH) Interagency Pain Research Coordinating Committee (IPRCC) by U.S. Health and Human Services Secretary Dr. Alex Azar. In 2020, she was appointed to the Centers for Disease Control and Prevention (CDC) opioid workgroup, a group that is charged with reviewing the scientific evidence for acute and chronic pain opioid prescribing guidelines and making recommendations on the planned 2021 CDC opioid prescribing guideline.  In 2021 Darnall was elected to the Board of Directors of the American Academy of Pain Medicine.

Early life and education 
Darnall graduated from Texas Woman's University with a B.A. in mass communications in 1994. She received her M.A. and Ph.D. in clinical psychology from the University of Colorado, Boulder in 1998 and 2002, respectively. She completed a post-doctoral fellowship in rehabilitation medicine at Johns Hopkins School of Medicine in 2004.

Scientific research 
Darnall is principal investigator for large NIH and PCORI-funded multi-site clinical trials that broadly investigate behavioral medicine strategies for acute and chronic pain, and voluntary patient-centered prescription opioid reduction.

Her lab creates and investigates brief, scalable, accessible and digital treatments for acute and chronic pain. She created of "Empowered Relief", a single-session (2 hour), evidence-based, skills-based pain management class that is embedded into primary care and pain clinics in 8 countries. In 2019, the Health and Human Services Pain Task Force cited her 2-hour skills-based class as being an important and promising solution to address the unmet need of broad scale access to behavioral pain care in the U.S. In 2021, JAMA Network Open published the efficacy results for an NIH-funded, 3-arm randomized controlled study comparing (1) 2-hour Empowered Relief vs. (2) a 2-hour health education class vs. (3) 8-session cognitive behavioral therapy for chronic low back pain. Authors of this study reported that "Empowered Relief" was non-inferior to 8-session CBT for reducing multiple symptoms, including pain catastrophizing, pain intensity, and pain interference at 3 months post-treatment. The single-session pain class was also found to impart substantial reductions for pain bothersome, sleep disturbance, anxiety, fatigue and depression at 3 months post-treatment. The study publication was covered by the National Institutes of Health and multiple media outlets including The New York Times, MedPage Today and Physician's Weekly.

In 2019 Darnall and colleagues published results for the first randomized controlled trial of "My Surgical Success", a tailored, on-demand and digital adaptation of Empowered Relief for perioperative pain management. The team reported that women who engaged with "My Surgical Success" required 6.5 fewer days of opioids after breast cancer surgery compared to women who received a digital health education control intervention.

Author 
Darnall is the author of over 100 journal articles.

She has authored three books:

Psychological Treatment for Patients with Chronic Pain
The Opioid-Free Pain Relief Kit: 10 Simple Steps to Ease Your Pain
Less Pain, Fewer Pills: Avoid the Dangers of Prescription Opioids and Gain Control Over Chronic Pain

She coauthored a fourth book with Heath McAnally and Lynn Freeman: Preoperative Optimization of the Chronic Pain Patient

Organizations 
Darnall was the 2012 president of the Pain Society of Oregon.

References 

Living people
Oregon Health & Science University faculty
Year of birth missing (living people)